Mashhad University of Medical Sciences (MUMS) is a medical school in Iran. Located in Razavi Khorasan province in the city of Mashhad, it was established in 1949 with Ferdowsi University of Mashad and separated in 1986 from its parent institution by national legislation.

The university is currently ranked as one of the best in the Middle East. In 2001, its department of Medicine was ranked first among the Iranian universities. The latest rankings put Mashhad University in 3rd place nationally.

MUMS has 8 faculties, operates 32 hospitals plus 179 rural and 147 urban health care centers. Its faculty include 600 teaching staff, 1700 physicians, 140 dentists, 130 pharmacists, and 25,402 staff employees. 
In 2001, 7,000 students were enrolled full-time.

History 
Mashhad Faculty of Medicine was officially opened on November 23, 1949 by Dr Zanganeh, the minister of culture. The school started out with 61 students, one associate professor and seven tutors. In 1956, when the School of Arts opened, the two schools merged to form the University of Mashhad.

In 1965 Badri Teymourtash and Esmael Sondoozi founded the University’s School of Dentistry.

In 1989, the faculties offering Medical Sciences' degrees across the country separated from the Ministry of Culture and Higher Education. New emerging medical universities have gone under management of Ministry of Health, Treatment and Medical Education. Thus the original University of Mashhad was divided into two independent universities: Ferdowsi University of Mashhad and Mashhad University of Medical Sciences.

Mashhad University of Medical Sciences now operates with 8 faculties, 32 hospitals, 179 rural and 147 urban health centers. It covers an enormous area stretching from the northeast to the central parts of the country, which makes it the largest university of medical sciences providing health care and treatment services.
With 597 teaching staff, 1645 MDs with different specialties, 138 dentists, 123 pharmacists and 25, 402 employees, the university provides health care and medical services to the area's large population, as well as to over 25 million tourists a year.

Overview 

Mashhad University of Medical Sciences is the main responsible of health of the Khorasan community. Its fundamental purpose is to ensure and improve the health of all people of Khorasan.

Schools & faculties 

 School of Medicine
 School of Dentistry

 School of Public Health 
 School of Nursery and Midwifery
 School of Nursery and Midwifery
 School of Paramedical
 School of Traditional Medicine
 School of Pharmacy
 School of Veterinary Medicine

Hospitals 
 Dr Sheikh Pediatric Hospital
 Ebn-e-Sina Psychiatry Hospital
 Dr Shariati Hospital
 Emam Reza Hospital
 Ghaem Hospital
 Hashemi Nezhad Hospital
 Khatam-al-Anbia Ophthalmology Hospital
 Montaserieh Transplant Center
 Ommul Banin Women Hospital
 Omid Cancer Center
 Shahid Kamyab Trauma Hospital
 Taleghani Trauma Hospital

Research centers 
 Allergy
 Buali Research Institute
 Biotechnology Center
 Cancer Research Center
 Cardiovascular
 Dental Research Center
 Dental Material Center
 Endocrinology and Metabolism
 Endoscopic Surgery
 ENT Research Center
 Eye Research Center
 Immunology
 Lung Research Center
 Medical Physics
 Medical Toxicology
 Microbiology and Virology
 M.R.C.C. for Infertility
 Nano Medicine
 Neonatal Research Center
 Neuroscience Research Center
 Nuclear Medicine
 Oral & Maxillofacial diseases
 Orthopedic 
 Patient Safety & Health Quality
 Pharmaceutical
 Pharmacological of M.P.
 Psychiatry and Behavioral R.C.
 Skin Disease
 Surgical Oncology Center
 Targeted Drug Delivery
 Vascular and Endovascular
 Women's Health

Admissions for foreign students 

To fulfill its international standing and obligations, MUMS admits students from different countries.

Students thinking of higher education in the field of medicine or other branches of medical sciences, or of advancing your future career, can apply. In addition to a variety of BSc programs related to medical sciences, one can directly apply for professional doctoral programs in Medicine, Dentistry, and Pharmacy to get a degree from one of the best medical sciences universities.

World rankings
Webometrics Ranking of World Universities, 2012: International Rank: 1459, National Rank: 5.

Notable faculty
Amirhossein Sahebkar

See also
Higher Education in Iran

References

External links

Official website

Universities in Iran
Medical schools in Iran
Educational institutions established in 1949
Buildings and structures in Mashhad
1949 establishments in Iran
Education in Razavi Khorasan Province